The Lake Leelanau Narrows Bridge is a bridge located on M-204 over Lake Leelanau Narrows in Leland Township, Michigan. It was listed on the National Register of Historic Places in 2000.

History
Lake Leelanau was a major impediment to east-west travel since this area was first settled in the mid-1800s. A wooden bridge was erected over the narrows in 1864; a replacement metal truss bridge was constructed in 1894–1895. In 1939, the Michigan State Highway Department decided to replace the aging truss bridge to help support the local tourist economy. They built this new bridge about 200 yards north. The bridge project was part of the Federal Emergency Administration of Public Works, which provided jobs in the Great Depression through funding public infrastructure projects.

Description
The Lake Leelanau Narrows Bridge is a three-span structure crossing the narrowest part of the  Lake Leelanau. The base of each pier are formed into pointed cutwaters at each end. Four posts on each pier support the bridge, with the exterior post ending with a graceful Streamline Moderne curve. A similar curve is apparent on the concrete railing posts above.

See also

References

External links
Photos at Historic Bridges

Road bridges on the National Register of Historic Places in Michigan
Infrastructure completed in 1939
Buildings and structures in Leelanau County, Michigan
National Register of Historic Places in Leelanau County, Michigan
Steel bridges in the United States